The Kamchatka-Aleutian triple junction is a triple junction of tectonic plates of the Fault-Fault-Trench type where the Pacific Plate, the Okhotsk Plate, and the North American Plate meet. It is located east of the Kamchatka Mys peninsula and west of Bering Island. Meiji Seamount is located to the southeast of the junction.

In the Kamchatka-Aleutian junction, the Kuril–Kamchatka Trench meets the Aleutian Trench. The former is a subduction zone while the latter is a transform fault in its western part.

References 

Triple junctions
Geology of the Pacific Ocean
Kamchatka Peninsula
Commander Islands